Bonnie Greer, OBE FRSL (born 16 November 1948) is an American-British playwright, novelist, critic and broadcaster, who has lived in the UK since 1986. She has appeared as a panellist on television programmes such as Newsnight Review and Question Time and has served on the boards of several leading arts organisations, including the British Museum, the Royal Opera House and the London Film School. She is Vice President of the Shaw Society. She is former Chancellor of Kingston University in Kingston upon Thames, London. In July 2022 she was appointed a Fellow of the Royal Society of Literature.

Life and career

Early life
Greer was born on the West Side of Chicago, the eldest of seven children born to Ben, a factory worker, and Willie Mae, a home maker. Greer's father was born to a family of Mississippi sharecroppers. He was stationed in Britain during World War II and took part in the D-Day landings.

Although she began writing plays at the age of nine, Greer originally set out on a legal career, but dropped out when her professor told her he did not think women should have a career in law. Instead she studied theatre in Chicago under David Mamet's supervision and at the Actors Studio in New York with Elia Kazan. Living in Manhattan's West Village (part of Greenwich Village) in New York City in the late 1970s and early 1980s, Greer had many gay male friends who became seriously ill.

Since 1986
Greer visited Scotland as part of a production at the Edinburgh Festival in 1986 and has been based in Britain since then. She told The Sunday Times in 2006 that she owes her life to the move. At the time, she made the decision to migrate to the UK because of her need to "escape the shadow of death" and the declining theatre scene in New York City. She acquired British citizenship in 1997. She has worked mainly in theatre with women and ethnic minorities, and is a former Arts Council playwright in residence at the Soho Theatre and for Nitro, previously known as the Black Theatre Co-operative and now called NitroBeat. Greer has played Joan of Arc at the Theatre Atelier in Paris.

She has written radio plays for BBC Radio 3 and Radio 4, including a translation of The Little Prince. Her plays include Munda Negra (1993), concerning the mental health problems of black women, Dancing on Blackwater (1994) and Jitterbug (2001), and the musicals Solid and Marilyn and Ella. The latter work began as a radio play broadcast in December 2005 (Marilyn and Ella Backstage at the Mocambo) after Greer watched a documentary on Marilyn Monroe which mentioned Monroe's assistance to the jazz vocalist Ella Fitzgerald as segregation prevented the singer from working at certain venues, especially the Mocambo nightclub. Adapted for the stage, Greer's radio play was given a production at the Edinburgh Festival Fringe in 2006 and was later rewritten and performed at the Theatre Royal Stratford East in 2008. The play was produced at the Apollo Theatre, in London's West End, in November 2009. She is the author of two novels, Hanging by Her Teeth (1994) and Entropy (2009), and is working on a play for the National Theatre Studio.

Greer was a regular contributor to BBC Two's Newsnight Review, and has been a panelist on the BBC's Question Time programme. She appeared on the edition in October 2009 that also featured Nick Griffin, then leader of the British National Party. Commenting after the recording she called it "probably the weirdest and most creepy experience of my life". The encounter formed the basis for her opera, Yes, written for the Royal Opera House with music by Errollyn Wallen, and which premiered there at the Linbury Studio Theatre in November 2011. She was formerly director of the Talawa Theatre Company and has served on the boards of the Royal Opera House and the London Film School. She is also a former theatre critic for Time Out magazine.

Greer's book Obama Music, partly a musical memoir, was published by Legend Press in October 2009. Reviewing it in The Independent, Lesley McDowell said: "Greer expertly weaves in memories of her own upbringing in Chicago, with more humour than you might expect, along with a clear, defined passion for the music she grew up listening to. She wants to show, too, how both the place she lived in, and the songs she listened to, were full of unseen boundaries that had held people back – but also gave them something to fight against." Her biography of Langston Hughes, Langston Hughes: The Value of Contradiction, was published in 2011 (Arcadia/BlackAmber Inspirations). Greer co-produced a documentary film, Reflecting Skin (directed by Mike Dibb) – on representations of black people in Western art – which was shown by the BBC in 2004. She is currently working on a novel about Rossetti. Greer's memoir A Parallel Life was published in 2014 and was described by Joy Lodico in The Independent as "the story of a journey deliberately and bravely taken against all expectations".

Greer is a member of the Arts Emergency Service, a British charity working with 16- to 19-year-olds in further education from diverse backgrounds. She is a patron of the SI Leeds Literary Prize for unpublished fiction by Black and Asian women in the UK. She is also a board member of the Authors' Licensing and Collecting Society (ALCS).

In April 2005, she was appointed to the British Museum's Board of Trustees and completed two full terms; from late March 2009 she served as Deputy Chairman. In 2011, she accepted the post of President of the Brontë Society. She resigned in June 2015, following internal disagreements about the society's direction.

Greer is a contributor to the 2019 anthology New Daughters of Africa, edited by Margaret Busby.

Greer also appears in the Sky Arts TV programme 'Discovering Film', as one of its leading movie experts celebrating the lives and work of some of the most prolific and iconic Hollywood stars, and comments frequently about members of the Royal Family on various ITN documentaries such as Channel 4's Charles: Our New King.

Honours and awards
Greer was appointed Officer of the Order of the British Empire (OBE) in the 2010 Birthday Honours for services to the Arts. She received her honour from Prince Charles.

In July 2022 she was appointed Fellow of the Royal Society of Literature in London.

Selected works

Books
 Hanging by Her Teeth (Serpent's Tail, 1994), novel. 
 Entropy (Picnic Publishing, 2009), novel. 
 Obama Music (Legend Press, 2009). 
 Langston Hughes: The Value of Contradiction (2011) (Arcadia/BlackAmber Books). 
 A Parallel Life (Arcadia Books, 2014).

Films
White Men Are Cracking Up (1996), screenplay)

Musicals
Solid
Marilyn and Ella (2008)

Opera
Yes (November 2011), Royal Opera House, Covent Garden

Plays
Munda Negra (1993)
Dancing on Blackwater (1994)
Jitterbug (Arcola Theatre, 2001)

Podcasts

Radio plays
The Little Prince
Marilyn and Ella Backstage at the Mocambo 
Ferguson (2016)

TV
Siren Spirits, Episode 4 (1994)

References

External links
Greer's contributor page at The Guardian.

Contributor page at the New Statesman.
"Abstraction of Wit in Black Heritage and Modern Times", 9 February 2010, Insights Public Lecture, University of Newcastle.  Lecture video recording, 2 hrs.]
"Marilyn, Ella ... & Bonnie – Newsnight's kindest critic brings the strange-but-true tale of two icons to Edinburgh". Sunday Herald, 6 August 2006.

1948 births
Living people
20th-century American women writers
African-American dramatists and playwrights
American emigrants to the United Kingdom
American women dramatists and playwrights
British dramatists and playwrights
Black British television personalities
Black British women writers
Naturalised citizens of the United Kingdom
Officers of the Order of the British Empire
Trustees of the British Museum
English people of African-American descent
African-American women writers
People from Greenwich Village
20th-century African-American women
Fellows of the Royal Society of Literature